The katar is a type of push dagger from the Indian subcontinent. The weapon is characterized by its H-shaped horizontal hand grip which results in the blade sitting above the user's knuckles. Unique to the Indian subcontinent, it is the most famous and characteristic of Indian daggers. Ceremonial katars were also used in worship.

Etymology 
Having originated in South India, the weapon's earliest name-form was likely the Tamil . Due to the schwa deletion in Indo-Aryan languages however, the word often came to be rendered as "katar" in modern Hindi and by extension in colonial transliterations.

History
The katar was created in Southern India, its earliest forms being closely associated with the 14th-century Vijayanagara Empire. It may have originated with the mustika, a method of holding a dagger between the middle and index finger still used in kalaripayattu and gatka today. The real name of this is "Kidaari" is from the ancient Tamil warfare class of weapons. Kidaari derived from the term "Kedayam Ari" meaning the "Shield Splitter" in Tamil. The name indicates this weapon being used to break shields and armor. The weapon was used by many ethnic Tamil infantry units aka "Kaalatpadai". This falls under the "mushtikai" class of Indian weapon system. "Mushti" means the fingers closed and "kai" means arm. 

A Tamil king would be gifted with a golden Kidari as a token of loyalty from the Kaalatpadai General. It was worn as a symbol of respect by the king to the soldiers who lay down their lives for him in war without any hesitation. Later Chhatrpati Shivaji Maharaj was gifted with a Kidaari during his conquest to Tamil Nadu. A specific type of dagger might have been designed for this, as maustika is described vaguely as a "fist dagger" in the arsenal list of Abu'l-Fazl ibn Mubarak. One of the most famous groups of early katar come from the Thanjavur Nayak kingdom of the 17th century. Katar dating back to this period often had a leaf- or shell-like knucklebow curving up from the top of the blade to protect the back of the hand. This form is today sometimes called a "hooded katara" but the knuckleguard was discarded altogether by the later half of the 17th century. As the weapon spread throughout the region it became something of a status symbol, much like the Southeast Asian kris or the Japanese katana. Princes and nobles were often portrayed wearing a katar at their side. This was not only a precaution for self-defense, but also meant to show their wealth and position. Upper-class Rajputs  would even hunt tigers with a katar. For a hunter to kill a tiger with such a short-range weapon was considered the surest sign of bravery and martial skill.

Some modern katar designs may include single-shot pistols built into either side of the weapon. In the 18th century, some traditional katar were refurbished with this innovation. The pistols are meant to deal the killing blow after the weapon has been thrust into the enemy.  The katar ceased to be in common use by the 19th century, though they were still forged for decorative purposes. During the 18th and 19th century, a distinctive group of katar were produced at Bundi in Rajasthan. They were ornately crafted and their hilts were covered in gold foil. These katar were shown at the Great Exhibition of 1851 in Crystal Palace, London. Since then, the weapon has sometimes been mistakenly referred to in English as a "Bundi dagger".

Appearance
The basic katar has a short, wide, triangular blade. Its peculiarity lies in the handle which is made up of two parallel bars connected by two or more cross-pieces, one of which is at the end of the side bars and is fastened to the blade. The remainder forms the handle which is at right angle to the blade. Some handles have long arms extending across the length of the user's forearm. The handle is generally of all-steel construction and is forged in one piece together with the blade.

Most katar have straight blades, but in south India they are commonly wavy. South Indian blades are often made broad at the hilt and taper in straight lines to the point, and elaborately ribbed by grooves parallel to the edges. Occasionally the blades are slightly curved, making them suited for slashing attacks. Some blades are forked into two points, which would later develop into the scissors katar.

The force of a katar thrust could be so great that many blades were thickened at the point to prevent them from bending or breaking. This also strengthened their use against mail. All katar with thickened tips are commonly described as "armour-piercing", but it is likely that only narrow and slender blades made this function possible. Such a weapon was capable of piercing textile, mail, and even plate armor. This quality was preferred for warfare, where an opponent was more likely to be armor-clad, as opposed to single combat.

The Indian nobility often wore ornamental katar as a symbol of their social status. The hilts may be covered in enamel, gems, or gold foil. Similarly, figures and scenes were chiselled onto the blade. Sheaths, generally made from watered steel, were sometimes pierced with decorative designs. The heat and moisture of India's climate made steel an unsuitable material for a dagger sheath, so they were covered in fabric such as velvet or silk. Some katar served as a sheath to fit one or two smaller ones inside.

Techniques
Because the katar's blade is in line with the user's arm, the basic attack is a direct thrust identical to a punch, although it could also be used for slashing. This design allows the fighter to put their whole weight into a thrust. Typical targets include the head and upper body, similar to boxing. The sides of the handle could be used for blocking but it otherwise has little defensive capability. As such, the wielder must be agile enough to dodge the opponent's attacks and strike quickly, made possible because of the weapon's light weight and small size. Indian martial arts in general make extensive use of agility and acrobatic maneuvers. As far back as the 16th century, there was at least one fighting style which focused on fighting with a pair of katar, one in each hand.

Aside from the basic straight thrust, other techniques include the reverse flipped pierce, inwards side slashing, outwards side slashing, cobra coiled thrust, and tiger claw pierce performed by jumping towards the opponent.

Popular culture
 In the 1994 version of The Jungle Book, Captain Boone shows Mowgli a katar dagger with 3 split blades.
 On Deadliest Warrior, a Rajput uses a katar dagger to wound a Roman centurion before killing him with a khanda.
 The Mortal Kombat character Rain was given a jamadhar katar for his return in Mortal Kombat 11 as part of the Kombat Pack 2 DLC.
 The Soulcalibur character Voldo consistently wields a pair of jamadhar katars throughout the series. 
 The Katars are one of the weapons used in Brawlhalla, which can be equipped by some legends.
 The Final Fantasy character Aphmau is a user of katars.
 The titular character in the 1975 horror film, The Ghoul kills with a katar.
 The cultists in the 1984 film, Indiana Jones and the Temple of Doom use katars.
 The 1967 Marathi musical Katyar Kaljat Ghusali and the 2015 film of the same name prominently feature a ceremonial katar, the bearer of which is pardoned 1 murder
 In the 1990s science fiction show Babylon 5, katars were seen being used as melee weapons by members of the Narn race.
 In the early 2000s Massive Multiplayer Online Game Ragnarok Online the Katar is the signature weapon of the Assassin's class.

See also
Aruval
Pata (sword)
Urumi

References

External links

Björn-Uwe Abels, A contribution to the development of the Indian punch-dagger, called Katar or Jamdhar, Waffen- und Kostümkunde 2012, 145–158 (in German with an English summary). 

Indian melee weapons
Weapons of India
Daggers
Fist-load weapons